Hector Og MacLean may refer to:
 Hector Og Maclean, 13th Clan Chief, also known as "Hector the Younger"
 Hector Og Maclean, 15th Clan Chief (?-1623)